Mark Estelle (born July 29, 1981) is a former professional American and Canadian football defensive back. He played for the Montreal Alouettes of the Canadian Football League from 2006 to 2011. He also played for the Houston Texans of the National Football League and the Cologne Centurions of NFL Europe.

High school years
While attending Carson High School in Carson, California, Estelle was a standout in football, baseball, and track & field. In football, he was an All-Conference cornerback and in track & field, he was the Los Angeles City Champion in the long jump. Mark Estelle graduated from Carson High School in 1999.

Junior college career
Estelle attended Los Angeles Southwest College for one year and lettered in football and track & field. In football, he was a first-team All-JUCO selection, unanimously voted into the All-Western State Conference team, and named the Team's Defensive Player of the Year.

NCAA career
Estelle attended Utah State University, and he was a three-year letterwinner in football. As a junior, he made 30 tackles, an interception, a fumble recovery, and 13 pass deflections.

Professional career
In 2005, Estelle attended the Montreal Alouettes and Baltimore Ravens training camps. The following year, he signed with the Houston Texans and was assigned to the Cologne Centurions of NFL Europa where he made 16 tackles, 11 knockdowns, and three forced fumbles. He moved on to the Texans training camp and finally joined the Alouettes in September and played in the final regular season game and started in the Canadian Football League East Division championship and the 93rd Grey Cup. He returned to the Alouettes for the 2007 and 2008 CFL seasons and was named an East Division All-Star in 2008. He was supposed to become a free agent after the  season, but was re-signed by the Alouettes on February 16, 2009. He became a free agent on February 15, 2012.

References

1981 births
Living people
American football defensive backs
American players of Canadian football
Montreal Alouettes players
Utah State Aggies football players
Cologne Centurions (NFL Europe) players
People from Carson, California
Players of American football from Los Angeles
Houston Texans players
Players of Canadian football from Los Angeles